Events in the year 1866 in Chile.

Incumbents
President: José Joaquín Pérez

Events
February 7 - Battle of Abtao
March 6 - Capture of the Paquete de Maule
March 31 - Bombardment of Valparaíso
August 22 - Chincha Islands War: Action of 22 August 1866
Chilean presidential election, 1866

Births

Deaths
José Raymundo Del Río, Chilean politician (born 1783)

 
1860s in Chile
Years of the 19th century in Chile
Chile